Jihad Ward (born May 11, 1994) is an American football defensive end for the New York Giants of the National Football League (NFL). He played college football at Illinois.

Early years
Ward attended Edward W. Bok Technical High School in Philadelphia, Pennsylvania. He didn't play football until his sophomore year. He began as a wide receiver and safety, before being converted into a stand up defensive end as a junior.

He received second-team All-City (2010) and first-team All-City (2011) honors. He also practiced basketball.

College career
Ward attended Globe Institute of Technology for two years to improve his grades. In 2013, he played in 7 games, making 26 tackles (3 for loss) and 2 sacks.

In 2014, he transferred to the University of Illinois. He was named a starter at defensive end in the fourth game of the season. He posted 51 tackles, 3 sacks, 4 fumble recoveries (led the conference), 2 forced fumbles, and one pass defended.

As a senior, he started all 12 games, playing both at defensive end and defensive tackle. He registered 53 tackles, 1.5 sacks, 2 passes defensed, one forced fumble and one fumble recovery. Against the University of Iowa, he had a career-high 11 tackles, including nine solo.

In his last two years, he had 104 tackles, 4.5 sacks, 5 fumble recoveries, 3 forced fumbles and 3 passes defensed.

Professional career
Coming out of college, most analysts projected Ward to be a second or third round selection. Although analysts had said he has above athletic ability for a man his size, can play both end spots in a 3-4 or 4–3, is large enough to play defensive tackle in 4–3, and could become a quality pass rusher in the NFL, he was also seen as a developmental project who needs improvement in his power, and has inconsistent balance in contact.

Ward was invited to the NFL scouting combine and also participated at Illinois' Pro Day and even improved on the majority of his combine numbers. Representatives and scouts from all 32 teams showed up at Illinois' Pro Day, which was run by head coach Lovie Smith. Defensive line coaches from the New England Patriots, Cincinnati Bengals, and the Houston Texans came especially to watch Ward perform.

Oakland Raiders
Ward was selected by the Oakland Raiders in the second round (44th overall) of the 2016 NFL Draft, after dropping because he had a knee injury that was expected to require arthroscopic surgery. Ward didn't participate much in organized team activities during the offseason. Ward finished his rookie season with 30 tackles in 16 games, 13 of which were starts.

On July 6, 2017, it was revealed that he had surgery on his left foot after injuring it during a workout, putting him out of action until mid-August. The injury limited him during the season, playing in only 5 games and was declared inactive in 10 contests.

Dallas Cowboys
On April 28, 2018, the Raiders traded Ward to the Dallas Cowboys in exchange for wide receiver Ryan Switzer. Cowboys defensive coordinator Rod Marinelli coached Ward in the 2016 Senior Bowl.

On September 1, 2018, the Cowboys waived Ward during final roster cuts.

Indianapolis Colts

On September 3, 2018, the Indianapolis Colts signed Ward to their practice squad. The team promoted him to the active roster on September 13, 2018. He was placed on injured reserve on October 26, 2018 with an ankle injury.

On October 1, 2019, Ward was released by the Colts.

Baltimore Ravens
On October 7, 2019, Ward was signed by the Baltimore Ravens.

On March 21, 2020, Ward re-signed with the Ravens. He was placed on the reserve/COVID-19 list by the team on November 26, 2020, and activated on December 5, 2020.

Jacksonville Jaguars
On March 17, 2021, Ward signed a one-year, $2.5 million contract with the Jacksonville Jaguars.

New York Giants
On March 21, 2022, Ward signed with the New York Giants on a one-year contract. He played in 17 games with 11 starts, recording a career-high 43 tackles and three sacks.

Ward re-signed with the Giants on March 16, 2023.

Personal life
Ward is Muslim. He has said that his name, Jihad, which is popular where he was raised in Philadelphia, has been misunderstood due to the negative connotations associated with the term, which has been used to describe Islamic violence against non-Muslims.

References

External links
It Was The Journey
Illinois Fighting Illini bio

1994 births
Living people
African-American Muslims
Players of American football from Philadelphia
American football defensive ends
American football defensive tackles
Globe Tech Knights football players
Illinois Fighting Illini football players
Oakland Raiders players
Dallas Cowboys players
Indianapolis Colts players
Baltimore Ravens players
Jacksonville Jaguars players
New York Giants players